Brentwood is a hamlet in the Town of Islip in Suffolk County, on Long Island, in New York, United States. The population was 62,387 at the 2020 Census, making it the most populous in Suffolk County and on all of Long Island outside of New York City.

History

Early history

In 1844, the area was established as Thompson Station and Suffolk Station, two new stations on the expansion of the Main Line of the Long Island Rail Road.

On March 21, 1851, it became the utopian community named Modern Times. In 1864, it was renamed Brentwood after the town of Brentwood, Essex, in England.

By contract, all the land in the colony was bought and sold at cost, with  being the maximum allowable lot size. The community was said to be based on the idea of individual sovereignty and individual responsibility. Individuals were encouraged to pursue their self-interest as they saw fit. All products of labor were considered private property. The community had a local private currency based upon labor exchange in order to trade goods and services (see Mutualism (economic theory)). All land was private property, with the exception of alleys which were initially considered common property but later converted to private property. Initially, no system of authority existed in the colony; there were no courts, jails or police. This appears to have given some credence to Warren's theories that the most significant cause of violence in society was most attributable to policies and law which did not allow complete individuality in person and property. However, the modest population of the colony might be considered a factor in this characteristic. The Civil War, as well as new residents that did not share the colony's philosophy, are said to have contributed to its eventual dissolution. Almost all of the original buildings that existed in Modern Times have been destroyed, aside from two Octagon houses, the original schoolhouse and a residence.

Modern-day Brentwood
During the first half of the 20th century, Brentwood was home to the Ross Health Resort Onehtah, managed by Dr. William H. Ross. Onehtah was a place where a person could escape the pollution of the city. It was thought that the smell of pine needles brought a person good health.

Brentwood is the site of Pilgrim State Hospital (once one of the world's largest hospitals and psychiatric institutions), now known as Pilgrim Psychiatric Center. A  portion of the psychiatric center was converted into the Brentwood State Park athletic field complex, which officially opened in 2009.

Brentwood's Centennial Celebration was on June 16–17, 1950. The 150th anniversary of the community was commemorated on May 9–11, 2007.

Brentwood High School has a nationally-recognized boys soccer team that won national championship in 2019.

Geography 

Demographics

, there were 62,387 people, 12,580 households, and 10,894 families residing in the CDP. The population density was 6028 per square mile (2,069.3/km2). There were 13,039 housing units at an average density of 1,295.6/sq mi (500.4/km2). The racial makeup of the CDP was 18.6% White, 16.3% African American, 0.5% Native American, 1.9% Asian, 0.11% Pacific Islander, and 5.7% from two or more races. Hispanic or Latino of any race were 64.3% of the population. At the 2020 American Community Survey the Latino population was: 27.7% Salvadoran, 11.1% Puerto Rican, 7.3% Dominican, 4.2% Ecuadorian, 3.3% Peruvian, 2.9% Mexican.

There were 12,580 households, out of which 46.6% had children under the age of 18 living with them, 61.2% were married couples living together, 17.4% had a female householder with no husband present, and 13.4% were non-families. 9.5% of all households were made up of individuals, and 4.4% had someone living alone who was 65 years of age or older. The average household size was 4.23 and the average family size was 4.19.

In the CDP, the population was spread out, with 29.9% under the age of 18, 10.6% from 18 to 24, 32.8% from 25 to 44, 18.5% from 45 to 64, and 8.2% who were 65 years of age or older. The median age was 31 years. For every 100 females, there were 100.2 males. For every 100 females age 18 and over, there were 97.5 males.

The median income for a household in the CDP was $68,314, and the median income for a family was $57,047. Males had a median income of $31,022 versus $25,946 for females. The per capita income for the CDP was $15,833. About 7.5% of families and 11.3% of the population were below the poverty line, including 13.7% of those under age 18 and 10.6% of those age 65 or over.

Education

School district 
Brentwood is located entirely within the boundaries of the Brentwood Union Free School District. As such, all children who reside within Brentwood and attend public schools go to Brentwood's schools.

Library district 

Brentwood is located entirely within the boundaries of the Brentwood Library District.

Emergency services

Brentwood is protected by the Brentwood Fire Department, a volunteer fire department. The department provides emergency fire rescue service to those within the political boundaries of the Brentwood Fire District. The area of responsibility spans  and covers the areas of Brentwood, North Bay Shore, and Baywood. The department does not provide Emergency Medical Service, which is instead provided by Brentwood Legion Ambulance, a volunteer ambulance department. Brentwood Legion Ambulance operates within the fire district borders. The Brentwood Fire Department and Brentwood Legion Ambulance work closely together to protect and serve those within their community.

Brentwood Fire Department
The Brentwood Fire Department was started in 1898 when local residents banded together to combat brush and forest fires that threatened their homes and farm land. On August 28, 1899, land was purchased from Mrs. Elvira S. Studley and the Brentwood Fire District was incorporated. The Department was first known as the Brentwood Hook and Ladder Company. A firehouse was built in 1900 and a used fire apparatus was purchased from the Islip Fire Department.

In 1926, the department was reorganized and Theodore Freund was elected as the first Fire Chief. On March 30, 1928, the original firehouse burned down and many records were destroyed. The old building was replaced with a two-story brick house on the same site which is still in use today as the department gym. In 1932, the name "Brentwood Fire Department" was formally adopted and in 1937, the hamlet's first fire hydrants were installed and the fire district's political boundaries were enlarged a year later. In 1955, a new fire house was built on Fourth Street, around the corner from the old firehouse. The Brentwood Fire Department continues to serve the residents of the Brentwood community, answering an average of 1,500 calls a year. The Brentwood Fire Department is regularly recognized as one of the busiest fire departments in Suffolk County. The Brentwood Fire Department is part of the Suffolk County Fire Rescue and Emergency Services (FRES) system. It holds department identifier number 3-2-0.

The District is governed by an elected five-member Board of Fire Commissioners (Board). The Board is responsible for the overall financial management of the District, including establishing policies and procedures to ensure that assets are properly safeguarded. Additionally, the Board is responsible for approving an annual budget to ensure the District's resources are efficiently used. The District Treasurer is the District's chief fiscal officer, appointed by the Board, and is responsible for the receipt, custody, disbursement, and accounting of District funds. The District's total expenditures for 2010 were approximately $5.8 million.

Firehouses within the district include Quanahasset Engine Company #1, Pines Engine Company #2, Ames & Elliott R.A.C. Company #3, Sagtikos Engine Company #4, Central Engine Company #5 and Edgewood Engine Company #6. There is also a Hook and Ladder Company #1 and the Fire Prevention Company #9.

Brentwood Legion Ambulance
Brentwood Legion Ambulance was founded and established by William J.A. Seymour in 1959. That year he was seriously injured after being involved in an automobile collision in Brentwood. It took almost two hours for an ambulance to arrive from a neighboring town, as Brentwood lacked any ambulance services. As a result, Mr. Seymour ended up being driven to the hospital in a private vehicle despite having sustained serious injury. Mr. Seymour recognized that this was a problem affecting his neighborhood, so he decided that changes needed to be made.

That year, Mr. Seymour gathered members from the American Legion’s Joseph Loeffler Post 1006, based in Brentwood. The ‘Legion’ portion of the department’s name is to honor the dedication of the members from the local American Legion Post that played a monumental part in establishing the ambulance service. Mr. Seymour and the members of the American Legion Post together were no more than 25 volunteers, giving their time to help their neighbors. They purchased a 1948 Cadillac hearse and converted it into an ambulance. Over the course of over 50 years, the Brentwood Legion Ambulance has expanded to over 250 members from all across Long Island, New York. The department has made upgrades to state-of-the-art equipment and vehicles since obtaining their first ambulance from 1948 all those years ago.

Transportation

Road 
The Long Island Expressway (Interstate 495) passes through the northernmost portion of the hamlet, while the Long Island Motor Parkway forms part of its northern border.

The Sagtikos State Parkway also runs through and serves the hamlet, while New York State Route 111 forms pat of its eastern border.

Rail 

Brentwood is served by the Brentwood station on the Ronkonkoma Branch of the Long Island Rail Road.

Bus 

The Brentwood LIRR station serves as a hub for the following Suffolk Transit buses, which serve the hamlet:
 3A: Hauppauge – South Shore Mall via Manatuck Road
 3B: Hauppauge – South Shore Mall via Broadway
 3D: Brentwood – Stony Brook
 S27: Babylon – Hauppauage
 S41: Bay Shore – Northport
 S45: Bay Shore – Smithtown

The S33 (from Sunrise Mall to Hauppauge) also passes through the northwestern portion of Brentwood while serving Suffolk County Community College.

Notable people

 EPMD, hip-hop pioneers, raised in Brentwood
 Robert Gallucci (1946–), former US Ambassador at Large (1994–96), currently Dean of the Edmund A. Walsh School of Foreign Service, Georgetown University (graduated Brentwood HS in 1962) He is currently the President of the John D & Catherine MacArthur Foundation 
 Andrew Jean-Baptiste (1992–), player for the Portland Timbers of Major League Soccer
 Mitch Kupchak (1954–), athlete and general manager of the NBA's Los Angeles Lakers
 Hector LaSalle an American lawyer and jurist 
 Frank Lopardo, opera singer
 James Kyrle MacCurdy (1875 - 1923) was a theater actor and playwright
 Craig Mack (1971–2018), hip-hop musician
 Dave Martinez (1964-), manager of Washington Nationals and former outfielder for Chicago Cubs
 Buddy McGirt (1964–), boxing champion and trainer
 Lester Quiñones (2000-), player for the Memphis Tigers men's basketball team
 Jef Raskin (Jeffrey Frank Raskin, 1943–2005), widely acknowledged as the "Father of the Macintosh", computer scientist and expert on the human/computer interface, inventor, conductor, artist, writer and businessman (graduated Brentwood HS 1960) 
 Ray Reid (1960-), former UConn and Southern Connecticut State University's men's soccer head coach, led UConn to 1 NCAA division 1 national title and SCSU to 3 division 2 titles
 Jai Rodriguez (1979–), actor and musician, born in Brentwood

See also

 Academy of Saint Joseph
 Brentwood High School (Brentwood, New York)
 Maslow-Toffler School of Futuristic Education

References

Bibliography

 Brentwood History Collection Photo and Brentwood History Collection Photo

Brentwood History Collection Photo
Freeman, Christian. 1852. Letter from Rev. B. F. Bowles. Brentwood History Collection Part 1, Part 2, and Part 3
Martin, James Joseph. Men Against the State: The Expositors of Individualist Anarchism in America, 1827-1908. Colorado Springs, Colo., Ralph Myles, 1970.
Spurlock, John Calvin. “Anarchy and Community at Modern Times, 1851–1863,” Communal Societies 3 (1983), 29–47.
 Wunderlich, Roger. Low Living and High Thinking at Modern Times, N.Y. Syracuse: Syracuse University Press, 1992.

External links

Brentwood Chamber of Commerce
 Brentwood Historical Society
 Long Island History: Brentwood
 
 
 

Census-designated places in New York (state)
Islip (town), New York
Hamlets in New York (state)
Census-designated places in Suffolk County, New York
Populated places established in 1851
Puerto Rican culture
Hamlets in Suffolk County, New York
1851 establishments in New York (state)